
The H.E. McElroy House in Boise, Idaho, USA, was designed by John E. Tourtellotte and constructed in 1901 in a neighborhood now designated the Fort Street Historic District. The brick veneer, -story Colonial design features a rectangular, symmetrical facade with a ridgebeam parallel to the street and an entry porch supported by Doric columns above flared, shingled walls. Dormers and gables are covered with square-cut and fish-scale shingles.

Hugh E. McElroy was a Boise attorney who helped to organize Idaho's Progressive Party. McElroy ran for governor as a Progressive candidate in 1914, but he lost the election to Democrat Moses Alexander.

See also
 Tourtellotte & Hummel

References

External links

Further reading
 Boise, Frank Thomason (Arcadia Publishing, 2009), pg. 58: Brief history of the house and neighborhood
 Progressive Standard Bearer, Evening Capital News, August 2, 1914, pg. 6: Biographical information about Hugh E. McElroy

National Register of Historic Places in Ada County, Idaho
Colonial architecture in the United States
Houses completed in 1901
Buildings and structures in Boise, Idaho